Maxime Pélican (born 12 May 1998) is a French professional footballer who plays as a forward for Championnat National 2 club Moulins Yzeure.

Club career
Pélican made his professional debut for Nice in a 1–0 Ligue 1 win against Lyon on 10 February 2019, coming on for Myziane Maolida in the 65th minute.

Personal life
Born in France, is of Catalan descent, with roots from the Cerdanya region.

References

External links
 
 

Living people
1998 births
Sportspeople from Perpignan
Association football forwards
French footballers
France youth international footballers
French people of Catalan descent
Toulouse FC players
OGC Nice players
Gazélec Ajaccio players
Moulins Yzeure Foot players
Ligue 1 players
Championnat National players
Championnat National 2 players
Championnat National 3 players
Footballers from Occitania (administrative region)